Action Point is a 2018 American comedy film directed by Tim Kirkby and starring Johnny Knoxville and Chris Pontius, both of whom had worked together on Jackass. Knoxville was inspired to make the film after seeing Matt Robertson's 2013 short documentary The Most Insane Amusement Park Ever, about Action Park, a theme park in New Jersey which was notorious for its poorly designed, unsafe rides, in addition to employing underaged, undertrained and often intoxicated staff.

As with Bad Grandpa, a previous film by Knoxville, Action Point features traditional Jackass-style stunts connected by a fictional narrative. It was released in the United States on June 1, 2018 by Paramount Pictures. It underperformed at the box office, grossing $5.1 million against its $19 million budget and received mostly negative reviews from critics, who called the film "boring, by-the-numbers and deflated."

Plot

Several years ago, D.C. was the owner of Action Point, a low-rent amusement park with numerous safety hazards; regardless, the park was popular with the youth due to it being the only amusement park in the area. However, a new amusement park named 7 Parks opens up one day and begins to draw customers away from Action Point. D.C. is also pressured by his loan officer Knoblach into selling his land due to his failure to pay off a $100,000 loan. Meanwhile, his estranged teenage daughter Boogie comes to visit and begins to help around the park as a summer job.

One night, D.C. and his staff break into 7 Parks to observe and sabotage the park, but are nearly caught. D.C. realizes that he needs to come up with something big to compete, eventually deciding that they need to start promoting Action Point as a park about what patrons can do, whereas 7 Parks is about what they can't do. He then decides to remove all the safety measures from the rides in an attempt to make the park stand out, causing several people - including himself - to be seriously injured. Boogie also confesses to park lifeguard Benny that the true purpose of her visit is to get D.C. to sign papers that would allow her mother's boyfriend to become her legal guardian.

As a publicity stunt, D.C. and the staff interrupt a local TV broadcast promoting the park which draws in customers, but sends the park into chaos due to the lack of proper rules and regulations. At Boogie's advice, D.C opens up a section for kids, but it is poorly designed causing her to inform legal authorities who then shut the park down.

D.C. and the staff repair the park and reopen it, but are told that the bank has foreclosed on the park. Furthermore, Boogie becomes upset after D.C. breaks his promise to take her to a concert, and gets drunk with the staff before they are all arrested. After D.C. bails her out, she snaps at him and reveals her intention for him to sign the papers. The next day, he finds her gone and learns that she may have left for Las Vegas on a bus. Desperate, he and Benny chase down the bus with their car but lose it after it collides with them.

D.C. then realizes that she was not on the bus and tracks her to a restaurant where he explains that the park has become his new family after losing his first one, and the reason he obsesses over it was because he did not want to lose it as well. Unable to pay off his loan, D.C. decides to blow up the park and sell off the land to Knoblach. To get back at him however, D.C. opens the park gates one last time and gives away free beer as he is no longer liable for any damages that will occur, and the drunk patrons go wild and cause massive damage to the park. Later that night, the staff gather one last time and shoot fireworks to commemorate their time in the park.

The next day, as Boogie prepares to leave, D.C. proposes that the two of them instead take a road trip and make a stop in Austin to attend the concert. Boogie is overjoyed and the former park staff offer to come along.

In the present day, a much older D.C. finishes his story to his granddaughter as Boogie arrives home and before he leaves, he pretends to have a heart attack in the yard, which Boogie calls out as the two of them share a laugh.

Cast
 Johnny Knoxville as Deshawn Chico "D.C." Carver
 Clover Nee as Rudie, D.C.'s granddaughter and Boogie's daughter
 Chris Pontius as Benny
 Eleanor Worthington Cox as Boogie Carver
 Susan Yeagley as adult Boogie Carver
 Dan Bakkedahl as Gregory Knoblach
 Camilla Wolfson as Mia
 Johnny Pemberton as Ziffel
 Brigette Lundy-Paine as Four Finger Annie
 Eric Manaka as Rodney
 Joshua Hoover as Pete
 Conner McVicker as Stiv
 Matt Schulze as Killer
 Michael Everson as Slappy
 Matthew Peterson as Travis Knoblach
 Leon Clingman as Joel Green

Production
Filming took place in Cape Town, South Africa on a $19 million budget.

Knoxville, in an interview with Vanity Fair, said that during filming, he was injured more times than his past films throughout his entire career: "four concussions, broke my hand, busted my meniscus, whiplash, stitches over my right eye which required stitches, lost a couple teeth." While filming the Alpine Slide sequence, he landed on his face, feet, and shoulder. After filming, he was sent to the emergency room, checked out, and went home. When he blew his nose to get rid of the blood, his left eye popped out of his socket. Freaked out, he immediately called his executive producer and advised him that he needed to return to the hospital. The doctors told him that he could not sneeze or blow his nose for six weeks. In the last days of filming, they filmed only the right side of his face, because he looked like "a Picasso painting."

Release
Originally titled Action Park, the film was released in the United States on June 1, 2018, having previously been slated for March 23 and May 11, 2018 releases.

Box office
In the United States and Canada, Action Point was released alongside Adrift and Upgrade, and was originally projected to gross around $10 million from 2,032 theaters in its opening weekend. However, after making $790,000 on its first day, estimates were lowered to $2–3 million. It ended up debuting to $2.3 million and finishing ninth, the worst opening of Knoxville's career and 23rd lowest-ever for a wide release. Deadline Hollywood attribute the low figure to the lack of Jackass stars in the film sans Knoxville and Chris Pontius, poor critical reviews and the difficulty of promoting an original R-rated comedy.

Critical response
The site's critical consensus simply reads, "Ouch." On Metacritic, the film has a weighted average score of 36 out of 100, based on 19 critics, indicating "generally unfavorable reviews". Audiences polled by CinemaScore gave the film an average grade of "C+" on an A+ to F scale.

References

External links
 

2018 comedy films
2018 films
American comedy films
Dickhouse Productions films
2010s English-language films
Films set in amusement parks
Films set in California
Films about beer
Films set in water parks
Films shot in South Africa
Films about alcoholism
Films with screenplays by Johnny Knoxville
Paramount Pictures films
Publicity stunts in fiction
2010s American films